Peter Newton (born June 3, 1970 in Honolulu) is an American sprint kayaker who competed from the early 1990s to the early 2000s (decade). Competing in three Summer Olympics, he earned his best finish of sixth twice (2000: K-2 500 m, K-4 1000 m).

Peter was the first American kayaker to win three medals at a Pan American Games, winning two gold and a silver in Argentina in 1995.

References
Sports-Reference.com profile

External links
2000 Olympic - k2 500m final (Video) Peter Newton and Angel Perez

1970 births
Sportspeople from Honolulu
American male canoeists
Canoeists at the 1992 Summer Olympics
Canoeists at the 1996 Summer Olympics
Canoeists at the 2000 Summer Olympics
Living people
Olympic canoeists of the United States
Pan American Games medalists in canoeing
Pan American Games gold medalists for the United States
Pan American Games silver medalists for the United States
Canoeists at the 1995 Pan American Games
Canoeists at the 1999 Pan American Games
Medalists at the 1995 Pan American Games
Medalists at the 1999 Pan American Games